The Haifanggou Formation, also known as the Jiulongshan Formation, is a fossil-bearing rock deposit located near Daohugou village of Ningcheng County, in Inner Mongolia, northeastern China.

The formation consists of coarse conglomerates, sandstone, mudstone, and thin coal layers deposited in deltaic and lacustrine environments.

The formation dates to the Callovian of the Middle Jurassic to the Oxfordian of the Late Jurassic.

The most prominent locality of the Haifanggou Formation are the Daohugou Beds, located near the village of Daohugou in southeastern Inner Mongolia. Other localities include Wuhuaxigou, Chentaizi, Jiangzhangzi, Wubaiding, Guancaishan, Haifenggou, Fanzhangzi, and Zhuanshanzi.

Dating

Daohugou bed 
The age of the Daohugou bed has been debated, and a number of studies, using different methodologies, have reached conflicting conclusions. Various papers have placed the fossils here as being anywhere from the Middle Jurassic period (169 million years ago) to the Early Cretaceous period (122 ma). One of the first studies on the age of the Daohugou beds, published in 2004 by He et al., found them to be Early Cretaceous, only a few million years older than the overlying Jehol beds of the Yixian Formation. The 2004 study primarily used Argon–argon dating of a tuff within the Daohugou Beds to determine its age.

However, subsequent studies cast doubt on this relatively recent age. In a 2006 study, Gao & Ren criticized He et al. for not including enough specifics and detail in their paper, and also took issue with their radiometric dating of the Daohugou tuff. The tuff, Gao and Ren argued, contains crystals with a variety of diverse radiometric ages, some up to a billion years old, so using dates from only a few of these crystals could not determine the overall age of the deposits. Gao and Ren went on to defend a Middle Jurassic age for the beds based on biostratigraphy (the use of index fossils), and the bed's relationship to a layer that is known to mark the Middle Jurassic-Late Jurassic boundary.

Another study, published in 2006 by Wang et al., argued that the 159-164 million years old Tiaojishan Formation underlies, rather than overlies, the Daohugou Beds. Unlike the earlier study by Gao and Ren, Wang et al. found an overall similarity between the fossil animals found in the Daohugou Beds and those from the Yixian Formation. The authors stated that"vertebrate fossils such as Liaoxitriton, Jeholopterus and feathered maniraptorans show much resemblance to those of the Yixian Formation. In other words, despite the absence of Lycoptera, a typical fish of the Jehol Biota, the Daohugou vertebrate assemblage is closer to that of the Early Cretaceous Jehol Biota than to any other biota."Wang et al. concluded that the Daohugou probably represents the earliest evolutionary stages of the Jehol Biota, and that it "belongs to the same cycle of volcanism and sedimentation as the Yixian Formation of the Jehol Group." However, a later study by Ji et al. argued that the key indicator of the Jehol biota are the index fossils Peipiaosteus and Lycoptera. Under this definition, the earliest evolutionary stage of the Jehol Biota is represented by the Huajiying Formation, and the Daohugou Formation is excluded due to the absence of Lycoptera fossils. Later in 2006, Liu et al. published their own study of the age of the Daohugou beds, this time using Zircon Uranium-lead dating on the volcanic rocks overlying and underlying salamander-bearing layers (salamanders are often used as index fossils). Liu et al. found that the beds formed between 164 and 158 million years ago, in the Middle to Late Jurassic. A 2012 study by Gao and Shubin agreed with this assessment, and reported an Argon–argon date of 164 plus or minus 4 million years ago for the Daohugou horizon.

Animal fossil content

Arthropods

Vertebrates

Flora

See also 
 
  and  — period's Asian prehistoric life, geological formations, fossil record
 Yixian Formation
 Callovian formations
 Tiourarén Formation, fossiliferous formation of Niger
 Qiketai, Toutunhe, Shishugou and Qigu Formations, fossiliferous formations of the Junggar Basin, Xinjiang
 Oxfordian formations
 Oxford Clay, England
 Tendaguru Formation, fossiliferous formation of Tanzania
 Cañadón Calcáreo Formation, fossiliferous formation of the Cañadón Asfalto Basin, Argentina

References

Further reading 
 Liaoning Stratigraphic Group. 1978. The Stratigraphic Tables of Liaoning. Geology Press 1-296

Geologic formations of China
Jurassic System of Asia
Jurassic China
Callovian Stage
Oxfordian Stage
Conglomerate formations
Mudstone formations
Shale formations
Sandstone formations
Coal formations
Deltaic deposits
Lacustrine deposits
Fossiliferous stratigraphic units of Asia
Paleontology in Inner Mongolia